Chelbardi (also Romanized as Chelbardī and Chelebardī; also known as Chehel Bardeh) is a village in Sardasht Rural District, in the Central District of Lordegan County, Chaharmahal and Bakhtiari Province, Iran. At the 2006 census, its population was 75, in 13 families.

References 

Populated places in Lordegan County